Don Rodrigo is an opera in three acts by Alberto Ginastera, the composer's first opera, to an original Spanish libretto by Alejandro Casona.  Ginastera composed the opera on commission from the Municipality of the City of Buenos Aires, Argentina.  The first performance was at the Teatro Colón, Buenos Aires, Argentina on 24 July 1964 with Carlo Cossutta in the title role. The production was directed by Jorge Petraglia and conducted by Bruno Bartoletti.

On February 22, 1966, Plácido Domingo had his international breakthrough by singing the title role of this opera at the US premiere of the work by the New York City Opera. Other cast members included Jeannine Crader as Florinda, Spiro Malas as Teudiselo, the king's tutor, and David Clatworthy as Don Julian, Florinda's father. Julius Rudel conducted, and the opera received 9 performances at New York City Opera. In November 1967 the production was also given, still with Plácido Domingo, on tour at the Dorothy Chandler Pavilion in Los Angeles.  Ginastera prepared from the opera a concert work for soprano and orchestra, which received its own first performance in October 1964.

Malena Kuss has published a detailed study of Ginastera's use of motives and of Argentine musical idioms in the opera.  Pola Suares Urtubey has published an analysis of the dramatic structure of the opera.

Roles
 Don Rodrigo, King of Spain (dramatic tenor)
 Don Julian, Governor of Ceuta	(baritone)
 Florinda, daughter of Don Julian (dramatic soprano)
 Teudiseld, Don Rodrigo's tutor (bass)
 Fortuna, maidservant to Florinda (mezzo-soprano)
 First maiden (soprano)
 Second maiden	(mezzo-soprano)
 Bishop (baritone)
 Blind hermit (baritone)
 First page (tenor)
 Second page (baritone)
 First blacksmith (tenor)
 Second blacksmith (baritone)
 First messenger (tenor)
 Second messenger (baritone)
 Young messenger (contralto)
 Voice in the dream (deep bass)
 Peasant boy (child)
 Peasant girl (child)

Synopsis
The setting is Toledo, Spain in the 8th century.  A note is that Don Rodrigo is also the Spanish name for Roderic, the last Visigothic king of Spain.  The three acts of the opera are divided into nine scenes linked by interludes, with labeling of the scenes as follows:

Act I
 Scene 1: Victory
 Scene 2: Coronation
 Scene 3: Secret

Act II
 Scene 4: Love
 Scene 5: Outrage
 Scene 6: Message

Act III
 Scene 7: Dream
 Scene 8: Battle
 Scene 9: Miracle

The scenes mirror each other in a format resembling a dramatic palindrome, with Scene 1 mirrored in Scene 9, Scene 2 mirrored in Scene 8, and so on, with Scene 5 forming the dramatic climax and fulcrum of the story.

At the start, Don Rodrigo has avenged an attack on his father.  He is then about to be crowned King of Spain.  Don Julian, Governor of Ceuta in Africa, introduces the King to his daughter Florinda.  Rodrigo promises Don Julian that he will look after her as a daughter if she is permitted to stay at the royal court.  At the coronation of Rodrigo, Florinda drops the crown.  Although some regard this accident as a baleful sign, Rodrigo then retrieves the crown and places it on his own head.  Historically, a chest in the Vault of Hercules has contained a locked mystery, which every King of Spain has respected since ancient times.  However, Rodrigo opens the locked chest, where he sees the secret in the form of an Arab flag and a curse.  The curse states that he who has opened the chest will be the last of his dynasty and that the Arabs will enslave Spain.

Later, Florinda bathes in a fountain, which Rodrigo sees.  He goes to Florinda’s bedroom at night, and forces himself on her.  Rodrigo then abandons her.  Florinda writes to her father, angrily calling for revenge on Rodrigo.

Don Julian raises a rebellion against Don Rodrigo.  At the battle at Guadalete, Don Julian is victorious against Don Rodrigo, which allows the Moors to enter Spain, fulfilling that part of the curse.  Rodrigo becomes a penniless vagrant, and eventually finds shelter with a blind hermit.  Florinda eventually discovers Rodrigo there.  Rodrigo confesses his sins, and finally dies in Florinda's embrace.

References

Further reading
Anonymous. "Manifestations de la saison: Alberto Ginastera à Paris". The World of Music 8(1) (January–February 1966), 9.
Anonymous. "New York Opera Finds a Winner". The Times issue 56569 (March 2, 1966): 15.
Bernheimer, Martin. "New York Opera's Don Rodrigo an Emphatic Success". Los Angeles Times (November 19, 1967): J1.
Bernheimer, Martin. "Return of Don Rodrigo". Los Angeles Times (November 24, 1970): E11.
D. D. "L'opéra (anciennement?) nouveau". Esprit 11(11) (November 1977): 92–94.
Davis, Peter G. "Christopher Keene Conducts Rodrigo". The New York Times (October 21, 1970): 40.
Ericson, Raymond. "Don Rodrigo Suits Marianna Ciraulo". The New York Times (October 29, 1970): 57.
Ferro, E. V. "Don Rodrigo: conflicto sin solución". Buenos Aires Musical (August 1964).
Ginastera, Alberto. "A proposito de Don Rodrigo". Buenos Aires Musical (July 1964).
Goldman, Richard Franko. "Current Chronicle: New York". The Musical Quarterly 52(3) (July 1966): 373–76.
Hughes, Allen "City Opera Work Stressed Action: Don Rodrigo Makes Music Subordinate to Story". The New York Times (October 9, 1970): 39.
Hughes, Allen, "Fine Florinda Sung by Eileen Schauler". The New York Times (April 8, 1971): 32.
Kohs, Ellis B. "The Season That Was: Los Angeles". The World of Music 10(1) (1968) 4–7.
Rockwell, John. "Keene on Pavilion Podium for Rodrigo". Los Angeles Times (December 2, 1970): G24.
Schonberg, Harold C. "Music: City Opera Company Sparkles in Its Rich New Setting: Don Rodrigo Presented at State Theater ". The New York Times (February 23, 1966): 42.
Schonberg, Harold C. "Decibel Power vs. Expressive Power". The New York Times (February 27, 1966): X15.
Schonberg, Harold C. "Opera: Orchestra Is Star: Rudel Has Major Part in Don Rodrigo". The New York Times (February 10, 1967): 31.

External links
 Boosey & Hawkes page on Don Rodrigo
 Libretto of Don Rodrigo (Spanish only)

Operas by Alberto Ginastera
Spanish-language operas
Operas
1964 operas
Operas set in the 8th century
Operas set in Spain
Cultural depictions of Spanish kings